Tree Fu Tom is a British live-action/CGI television series shown on BBC channels in the UK and Universal Kids and NBC in the USA. It is set in a miniature magical countryside and village area (Treetopolis) on the top a big tree in a British-type woodland. Many of its characters are anthropomorphised arthropods, and it features species of insect which are raised and controlled like cattle on a ranch: aphids, ladybirds, and a rhinoceros beetle. The programme is aimed at two- to six-year-olds.

The series features a number of voice actors who have appeared in Doctor Who. Sophie Aldred (who voices the animated Tom) played Seventh Doctor companion Ace and David Tennant (who voices Twigs in Series 1 and 2) was the Tenth Doctor. The actor who plays Tom in the live-action opening and closing sections of the show, Adam Henderson, is Sophie Aldred's son.

The character of Twigs was recast from Series 3 and played by Mark Bonnar, who has also been in Doctor Who, playing Jimmy and his "ganger" duplicate in the two-parter The Rebel Flesh and The Almost People.

Premise
In each episode, Tom comes out of his house, puts on a power belt, and runs across his lawn towards a crooked tree in the woods protected by a magic shield. Using the power belt, he performs some Tree Fu moves, jumps up, shrinks to insect size as he flies into the tree, and enters the world of Treetopolis. He is skilled in that world's magic, and often gets characters out of scrapes. Some of the characters are four of Tom's friends, Twigs, Squirmtum, Ariela, and Zigzoo. The tree's sap is shown as a glowing orange magic liquid.

At least twice in each episode, Tom has to call on "the big world" for magical help: breaking the fourth wall, As a host, he asks his viewers to make magical moves and say magical words to assist him. The magical power is shown as an orange glow that appears offscreen and flies towards Tom, who uses it to complete the spell.

The movements which the audience are called on to make are particularly beneficial for the development of children with developmental coordination disorder.

The scenario includes magical hoverboards (called "leaf boards"), a sport called Squizzle and many sorts of cakes and snacks that the inhabitants of Treetopolis like to eat.

At the end of each episode, Tom says goodbye to his friends and flies out of the tree's magic field. Back in the normal world, Tom flies up and says to his viewers before he gets back to the surface: "Thanks for helping me in Treetopolis. See you soon for another adventure! Bye, for now!" Tom runs out of the woods, across his back lawn, and in through his back door before the credits play.

Purpose
The series was developed in conjunction with the Dyspraxia Foundation with the aim of promoting movement. Foundation specialists Sally Payne and Dr Lynda Foulder-Hughes worked with the series creators to develop the movements Tree Fu Tom uses to create magic. Five percent of children have developmental coordination disorder, and these movements are similar to those used by occupational therapists to help child development. It is also hoped that the spells will help get exercise into the lives of young children.

Characters
Tom, the main character, and a host. He uses a magical belt to transport into Treetopolis and cast spells with help from the 'big world'. Though he is usually the best at spells, he is a kind, optimistic and modest character and often has to turn to his friends for advice when things go wrong. One of his catchphrases is "Tree Fu Go!", "Oh My Trees!" "Thanks for your help!" where he shows his viewers how to do the 'big world' magic spell segment. Voiced by Sophie Aldred, Lucien Dodge (US), live actor Adam Henderson.

Twigs, a silly and energetic Scottish Acorn Sprite who is Tom's sidekick and best friend, and frenemy of Chezz, who he usually encounters conflict. His catchphrases are "I am a Genius" and "We're Doomed!" and "Wowzers!".. Voiced by David Tennant in the first two series (2012–2013), and Mark Bonnar in the other three (2014–2016).

Zigzoo, an eccentric tree frog who is the local inventor at Treetopolis, though not all of his inventions work out quite as well as he (or others) hope. Though it has never officially been confessed, certain episodes seem to suggest he may have a crush on Ariela. One of his catchphrases is "Oh Ribbety Roo". Voiced by Tim Whitnall (2012–2014) and David Holt (2016).

Squirmtum, a pill woodlouse who is a miner of sap in the caverns and general-purpose workman, and not the most intelligent of creatures. He can curl into a ball, and in that form he can roll fast. He wears a miner's helmet with a firefly called Flicker as his helmet light. Voiced by Tim Whitnall 2012–2014 and Duncan Wisbey (2016)

Ariela, the alpha female character, a beautiful but feisty butterfly in charge of the Branch Ranch at Treetopolis, generally does not accept help from others, and likes to get her own way; but she is always there when her friends need her. She is beautiful, sassy, tomboyish and polite. She is highly competitive and rather impatient. She appears to have the closest relationship with Zigzoo – who invents many gadgets for her ranch throughout the episodes. Voiced by Samantha Dakin.

Rickety McGlum, an elderly spider of Treetopolis; he used to be thought of as scary, but is now a close friend to Tom and his friends. He is additionally a Squizzle expert and trainer, and leader of the Tree Fu Rangers. He is the grandfather of Racquette. Voiced by Tim Whitnall 2012–2014 Duncan Wisbey (2016).

Treetog the Tree Spirit, the plump friendly leader of Treetopolis. She acts as the schoolteacher as well, teaching the young sprite creatures and Tom traditional tree fu spells. Voiced and Live acted by Sharon D. Clarke.

The Mushas (Puffy and Stink), sister and brother respectively, forever arguing, and the main antagonists, two naughty animated toadstool-type fungi who cause trouble, though occasionally, Puffy seems to be the true antagonist. voiced by Sophie Aldred and Tim Whitnall 2012–2014 Duncan Wisbey (2016).

Sprites including Chezz, Bertie, Hazel, Lavender, Sweetpea and Goose throughout the first series, these were only background characters, but they began to make more frequent appearances in the latter series. Chezz In particular is a very arrogant, badge-obsessed conker sprite with rhoticism, who likes to show off. Despite having mild respect for Tom, Chezz is usually arguing or attempting to compete with Twigs – often teasing him over his smaller size.

Muru, enigmatic, Spanish, praying mantis introduced as part of the new 2016 cast, red magic teacher and friend of Tom. Has a magical stick that is able to rewind and fast forwards time. He uses an extension of tree fu magic (red magic) that allows the user to take on attributes of a big-world animal such as the speed of a cheetah or strength of an elephant. He uses a magic spell stone which has all the animal spells upon it. Voiced by David Holt.

Racquette Troublesome female spiderling with a strong northern accent, and the granddaughter of Rickety. Although she loves and respects her granddad, she wishes he would allow her to adventure, believing him to be dull and overly cautious. She can be quite headstrong, though she usually realises when she makes a mistake. When bored or upset, she begins to spin webs in her hands. Spiders in this scenario appear to have a web spinning method similar to Spider-Man, where it comes from their wrists. Voiced by Sophie Aldred.

Rootle and Shade, shy brother and sister dark sprites that live in the deep root caverns. They were afraid that the light would turn them to jelly. Unlike the normal sprites, they lack wings and have snail shells on their heads. Their ears and eyes are much larger than those of the other sprites. Rootle has an odd impediment where he switches the first letters of characters names around (Twom and Tigs, Pink and Stuffy, though he does not do this with Shade).

Episodes

Series 1 (5 March 2012 - 22 March 2012)
Episode 1: "May the Best Berry Win": the episode is about the Biggest Chuckleberry in Treetopolis contest.
Episode 2: "Squizzle Quest": a game projectile goes astray when Twigs accidentally uses the mega triple wing throw which makes the squizzle fall into Rickety McGlum's Yard.
Episode 3: "Zigzoo the Zero": Zigzoo gets tired of inventions failing.
Episode 4: "So Long Greenhorns": Tom and Twigs swap Spell School for running Ariela's ranch, and vice versa.
Episode 5: "Hide and Squeak": a game of hide and seek; Squirmtum's fear of the dark gets better for him.
Episode 6: "Wishful Thinking": the Mushas get hold of a magic pebble.
Episode 7: "Zigzoo's Robot": Zigzoo builds a robot of himself that causes other problems than it solves.
Episode 8: "With Friends Like These": some go off to play Squizzle when they are supposed to be helping Squirmtuum. Puffy and Stink see a chance.
Episode 9: "Buzzworthy": bees get into the ranch.
Episode 10: "Winging It": Squirmtum tries to fly using a jetpack with wings.
Episode 11: "Crystal Catastrophe": Treetog's casting crystal gets broken.
Episode 12: "Fungus Among Us": the Mushas trick Tom and Twigs into making a mess of Treetog's castle.
Episode 13: "The Big Ranch Rodeo": trouble organising a rodeo.

Series 2 (3 September 2012 – 21 March 2013)
Episode 14: "One for All!": Tom leads his under-performing  team on a quest to find the enchanted 
Episode 15: "Treefle Tom": Tom and his friends' greed for tasty  treats leads to trouble.
Episode 16: "The Great Journey": Tom and Twigs get a crash course in being ranchers as they lead an epic baby beetle drive.
Episode 17: "Not So Fast": Ariela's impatience causes trouble for Tom and Treetopolis.
Episode 18: "Hovering Humblebugs": Tom's attempts to attain perfection cause problems for the humblebugs.
Episode 19: "Treasure Hunt": Treelings and Mushas are thrown together to compete in Treetopolis' annual treasure hunt.
Episode 20: "Tom's Big Mess": it is the Annual Tidy Up and Tom's careless cleaning efforts lead to disaster.
Episode 21: "Sappy Day": preparations for Sap Day are thrown into turmoil when the Mushas get up to mischief.
Episode 22: "Grubble Trouble": Tom and Twigs' friendship is not the only thing threatened when Twigs gets a new pet.
Episode 23: "Rickety Rescue": when Tom and friends get into trouble, it is up to Rickety to leap to the rescue.
Episode 24: "Weather Bother": Zigzoo invents a weather machine to create perfect conditions for each of his friends.
Episode 25: "Tiny Tom": Tom tackles titanic troubles as he is accidentally shrunk to the size of Twigs' toes.
Episode 26: "The Lost Stone": a calm, quiet pond creature accidentally absorbs Tom's .

Series 3 (30 Oct 2013 – 7 April 2014)
Episode 27: "Twigs' Big Boost": Twigs eats Ariela's special booster berries, which causes random growth spurts; he desperately tries to hide his dramatically growing hands, ears and feet from his friends.
Episode 29: "Harvest Antics": it is Harvest day in Treetopolis, which is almost ruined when a colony of ants almost take over to eat all the food. Tom and Twigs try all sorts of methods to save the food from the ants.
Episode 30: "Tom's Fan Club": after Tom masters an impossible Super Grab Spell, the Sprites all worship Tom for demonstrating it. It gets in the way when Twigs has to deliver Boing Beetle eggs to Ariela's ranch, who thinks they belong in the barn, but when Twigs and Ariela get stuck in there, Tom must leave his fan club in order to save them.
Episode 31: "Tom's Teddy": when it is Clean-Up Treetopolis Day Tom loses his Teddy and starts wrongfully accusing Twigs, Ariela, Squirmtum and Zigzoo of stealing it. It was really the Mushas who stole it for their Slime Teddy; when Tom learns what he has done, he makes up for it.
Episode 32: "Conkerball Run": Tom and Twigs find Rickety's old racing car, the Turborantula, and learn that he lost the Conkerball Cup in a race with the Mushas. Tom, Twigs and Zigzoo challenge the Mushas to a race to win it back, but Tom and Twigs are competitive and do not work as a team. It appears they might lose the race again, but when the car derails with a panicked Zigzoo, Tom and Twigs must learn what they did wrong.
Episode 33: "Bad Tom": when the Mushas discover an Invisibility Ring, they use it to frame Tom and Twigs on Spooky Day by doing mean tricks to Zigzoo, Squirmtum and Ariela. They eventually learn not to jump to conclusions.
Episode 34: "The Cavern Coaster": when Squirmtum has a lot to do in the Caverns, Zigzoo invents a Cavern Coaster to speed things along. Since the Caverns are dangerous, he is literally carried away with it. He and the Sprites then have to be rescued.
Episode 35: "Woodgrubs": Tom, Twigs, Zigzoo and Squirmtum investigate the Caverns when there are mysterious Treequakes and see that it is caused by Woodgrubs eating the dead bark.
Episode 36: "Chuckleberry Tom": Tom uses Chuckleberry Juice to make himself funny; it is fun at first but gets out of hand when Zigzoo almost falls off a bridge and distracts Treetog and the Sprites from cheating Mushas with Boohoo Berries.
Episode 37: "Ranger Tom: Fungus Finder": Tom and Twigs empty out a cart full of stuff, but it turns out flowers are useful to wake up Rickety. They soon learn to be prepared when the Mushas, Rickety, Chezz, Petal and Twigs almost meet their end with a Whirlpool Fungus and a Spritetrap Fungus.
Episode 38: "Don't Go Glowy": Tom, Twigs and Ariela are on the search for a Bubbleroot. Ariela's pet Gloworm Glowy eats one and turns into a Gremmel, getting her into trouble, but with Tom and Twig's help she overcomes her fears of her.
Episode 39: "Last Squizzle": Tom, Twigs, Stink and Puffy are in need of new . They need to go looking for them, but with Stink, Puffy and Twig's unwillingness to cooperate, they get into trouble.

Series 4 (30 June 2014 – 8 December 2014)
Episode 40: "Tom's Big Spell"
Episode 41: "Super Squirmtum"
Episode 42: "The Golden Spore"
Episode 43: "Ranger Tom: Super Helper"
Episode 44: "Tom and the Warble Weeds"
Episode 45: "Ranger Tom: Fun Guy!"
Episode 46: "Twigs' Tall Tale"
Episode 47: "Ranger Tom and the Carrots of Doom"
Episode 48: "Picture This"
Episode 49: "Dragon Fruit Fiasco"
Episode 50: "Ranger Tom: A Badge Too Far"
Episode 51: "King Stink"
Episode 52: "Tree Fu Tom: The Sprite Before Christmas"

Series 5 (8 February 2016 – 3 October 2016)
Episode 53: "Stuck"
Episode 54: "Ranger Tom and the Musha Rangers"
Episode 55: "Flicker Goes Out"
Episode 56: "It's a Kind of Magic"
Episode 57: "Dark Sprites"
Episode 58: "Ranger Tom a Friend Indeed"
Episode 59: "How to Train Your Buggle"
Episode 60: "Treenado"
Episode 61: "Friendship Day"
Episode 62: "Box of Tricks"
Episode 63: "Ranger Tom: Beetles and Grubbles"
Episode 64: "Need for Less Speed"
Episode 65: "The Good the Bad and the Mushas"
Episode 66: "Racquette Risks a Rescue"
Episode 67: "Musha Island"
Episode 68: "An A-maze-ing adventure"
Episode 69: "Red Musha Mischief"
Episode 70: "Ranger Tom and Ginormous George"
Episode 71: "Dead Branch Challenge"
Episode 72: "Raiders of the Lost Bark"

References

External links
 
Tree Fu Tom: the boy with magical powers comes to CBeebies
Tree Fu Tom Episode list, images
 

2010s British children's television series
2010s British animated television series
2012 British television series debuts
2016 British television series endings
British computer-animated television series
British children's animated action television series
British children's animated adventure television series
British children's animated superhero television series
British preschool education television series
British television series with live action and animation
English-language television shows
BBC children's television shows
NBC original programming
Animated television series about children
Animated television series about insects
Animated television series about frogs
CBeebies
Television series by FremantleMedia Kids & Family